Košarkaški klub Partizan is a professional basketball club based in Belgrade, Serbia that competes in the Basketball League of Serbia, Adriatic League and Euroleague. The club was founded on 4 October 1945, as a basketball section of the Sports Association of the Central House of the Yugoslav Army.

Košarkaški klub Partizan played 13 years in row Euroleague and the most significant season was season 2009-10 when they played in 2010 Euroleague Final Four.

Partizan in Euroleague

2001-02

Roster

Statistics

Regular season
Group D

Standings

Results
All times given below are in Central European Time.

2002-03

Roster

Statistics

Regular season
Group C

Standings

Results
All times given below are in Central European Time.

2003-04

Roster

Statistics

Regular season
Group A

Standings

Results
All times given below are in Central European Time.

2004-05

Roster

Statistics

Regular season
Group A

Standings

Results
All times given below are in Central European Time.

External links
  
 KK Partizan at euroleague.net

Euroleague
EuroLeague